Beta-defensin 118 is a protein that in humans is encoded by the DEFB118 gene.

References

Further reading 

 
 
 

Defensins